Home is a 1982 studio album by South African jazz trumpeter Hugh Masekela. The album was re-released as a CD in 1996 via Columbia Records with a slightly rearranged track listing.

Track listing

Personnel
Band
Hugh Masekela – flugelhorn, vocals, producer
Charles "Poogie" Bell – drums 
Russell Blake – electric bass
Victor Mhleli Ntoni – electric bass, electric guitar, vocals
Eric Gale – electric guitar
Hotep Cecil Barnard – keyboards 
Rene McLean – saxophone, flute
Aderemi Kabaka – talking drum, drums, percussion
Thembi Mtshali – vocals

Production
Joe Ferla – engineer 
Jolie Levine – producer 
Stewart Levine – producer 
Bob Messo – assistant engineer

References

External links

 

1982 albums
Hugh Masekela albums
Albums produced by Stewart Levine